That Kind of Girl is a British cult film and the directorial debut of Gerry O'Hara. Produced by Robert Hartford-Davis with a script by Jan Read, it was released in 1963.

The film's subject is premarital sexual relationships and sexually transmitted diseases in an English 1960s millieu.

Cast
 Margaret Rose Keil as Eva
 David Weston as Keith Murray
 Linda Marlowe as Janet Bates
 Peter Burton as Elliot Collier
 Frank Jarvis as Max
 Sylvia Kay as Mrs. Millar
 David Davenport as Mr. Millar

DVD and Blu-ray release  

That Kind of Girl was released on DVD and Blu-ray in the UK on the BFI's Flipside imprint on 25 January 2009.

The disc also includes a selection of short films and an interview with Robert Hartford-Davis (1968, 14 mins) in which That Kind of Girl's producer discusses his film career and production methods.

References

External links 
 

British sexploitation films
1963 films
1960s English-language films
1960s British films